Westview is a hamlet in the Canadian province of Saskatchewan. It lies adjacent to the west side of the city of Melville.

Demographics 

References

Designated places in Saskatchewan
Organized hamlets in Saskatchewan
Stanley No. 215, Saskatchewan
Division No. 5, Saskatchewan